Fiachra Cáech (died 608) was the founder of a branch of the Uí Chóelbad dynasty of Dál nAraidi that would ruled the petty-kingdom of Eilne, in Ulaid, medieval Ireland. Fiachra was the brother of Fiachnae Lurgan, king of Dál nAraidi and over-king of Ulaid. This offshoot of the Uí Chóelbad based in Eilne became known as the Dál nAraidi in Tuiascirt.

References

Cruthin
Ulaid
Ancient Irish dynasties
608 deaths
Year of birth unknown